Radinović (Cyrillic script: Радиновић) is a surname derived from a masculine given name Radin. It may refer to:

Duško Radinović (born 1963), footballer
Kujava Radinović, second wife of King Stephen Ostoja of Bosnia
Pavle Radinović (sometimes spelled Radenović) (1381–1415), magnate in the Kingdom of Bosnia
Uglješa Radinović (born 1993), football midfielder
Vanja Radinović (born 1972), football coach
Velimir Radinović (born 1981), basketball player

Serbian surnames